The 2009 Los Angeles Dodgers season saw the team defend their National League West title while earning the best record in the National League, and marked the 50th anniversary of their 1959 World Series Championship. The Dodgers reached the National League Championship Series for the second straight season only to once more fall short in five games against the Philadelphia Phillies.

Spring training

2009 saw the Dodgers open their brand new spring training facility, Camelback Ranch-Glendale. The 13,000-seat stadium and surrounding facilities that the Dodgers share with the Chicago White Sox replaced their former facility at Holman Stadium in Vero Beach, Florida, where the team had trained in the spring since 1948. This also marked the Dodgers debut as a member of the Cactus League.

Regular season

Season standings

Record vs. opponents

Game log 

|-  bgcolor="ffbbbb"
|- align="center" bgcolor="bbffbb"
| 1 || April 6 || @ Padres || 4–1 || Kuroda (1–0) || Peavy (0–1) || Broxton (1) || 45,496 || 1–0
|- align="center" bgcolor="ffbbbb"
| 2 || April 7 || @ Padres || 4–2 || Young (1–0) || Wolf (0–1) || Bell (1) || 20,035 || 1–1
|- align="center" bgcolor="bbffbb"
| 3 || April 8 || @ Padres || 5–2 || Billingsley (1–0) || Mujica (0–1) || Broxton (2) || 31,700 || 2–1
|- align="center" bgcolor="ffbbbb"
| 4 || April 9 || @ Padres || 4–3 || Meredith (1–0) || Wade (0–1) || Bell (2) || 29,710 || 2–2
|- align="center" bgcolor="ffbbbb"
| 5 || April 10 || @ Diamondbacks || 9–4 || Garland (1–0) || McDonald (0–1) || || 31,036 || 2–3
|- align="center" bgcolor="bbffbb"
| 6 || April 11 || @ Diamondbacks || 11–2 || Stults (1–0) || Petit (0–1) || || 35,024 || 3–3
|- align="center" bgcolor="bbffbb"
| 7 || April 12 || @ Diamondbacks || 3–1 || Wolf (1–1) || Haren (0–2) || Broxton (3) || 25,485 || 4–3
|- align="center" bgcolor="bbffbb"
| 8 || April 13 || Giants || 11–1 || Billingsley (2–0) || Johnson (0–2) || || 57,099 || 5–3
|- align="center" bgcolor="bbffbb"
| 9 || April 15 || Giants || 5–4 || Broxton (1–0) || Howry (0–1) || || 42,511 || 6–3
|- align="center" bgcolor="bbffbb"
| 10 || April 16 || Giants || 7–2 || Stults (2–0) || Zito (0–2) || || 36,553 || 7–3
|- align="center" bgcolor="bbffbb"
| 11 || April 17 || Rockies || 4–3 || Mota (1–0) || Embree (0–1) || Broxton (4) || 45,145 || 8–3
|- align="center" bgcolor="bbffbb"
| 12 || April 18 || Rockies || 9–5 || Billingsley (3–0) || Cook (0–1) || || 36,765 || 9–3
|- align="center" bgcolor="bbffbb"
| 13 || April 19 || Rockies || 14–2 || Elbert (1–0) || Jiménez (1–2) || || 41,474 || 10–3
|- align="center" bgcolor="ffbbbb"
| 14 || April 21 || @ Astros || 8–5 || Ortiz (1–0) || Kershaw (0–1) || Valverde (1) || 26,360 || 10–4
|- align="center" bgcolor="ffbbbb"
| 15 || April 22 || @ Astros || 6–5 || Sampson (1–0) || Belisario (0–1) || Hawkins (2) || 26,725 || 10–5
|- align="center" bgcolor="bbffbb"
| 16 || April 23 || @ Astros || 2–0 || Billingsley (4–0) || Rodríguez (1–2) || Broxton (5) || 26,081 || 11–5
|- align="center" bgcolor="bbffbb"
| 17 || April 24 || @ Rockies || 6–5 || Kuo (1–0) || Corpas (0–1) || Broxton (6) || 36,151 || 12–5
|- align="center" bgcolor="bbffbb"
| 18 || April 25 || @ Rockies || 6–5 || McDonald (1–1) || Jiménez (1–3) || Troncoso (1) || 31,476 || 13–5
|- align="center" bgcolor="ffbbbb"
| 19 || April 26 || @ Rockies || 10–4 || Marquis (3–1) || Kershaw (0–2) || || 35,505 || 13–6
|- align="center" bgcolor="ffbbbb"
| 20 || April 27 || @ Giants || 5–4 || Valdéz (1–0) || Belisario (0–2) || Wilson (4) || 30,091 || 13–7
|- align="center" bgcolor="bbffbb"
| 21 || April 28 || @ Giants || 5–3 || Broxton (2–0) || Howry (0–2) || Ohman (1) || 30,482 || 14–7
|- align="center" bgcolor="ffbbbb"
| 22 || April 29 || @ Giants || 9–4 || Lincecum (2–1) || Stults (2–1) || Wilson (5) || 37,717 || 14–8
|- align="center" bgcolor="bbffbb"
| 23 || April 30 || Padres || 8–5 || Belisario (1–2) || Gregerson (0–1) || Broxton (7) || 54,628 || 15–8
|-

|-  bgcolor="ffbbbb"
|- align="center" bgcolor="bbffbb"
| 24 || May 1 || Padres || 1–0 || Broxton (3–0) || Sánchez (1–1) || || 47,210 || 16–8
|- align="center" bgcolor="bbffbb"
| 25 || May 2 || Padres || 2–1 (10) || Mota (2–0) || Gregerson (0–2) || || 47,680 || 17–8
|- align="center" bgcolor="bbffbb"
| 26 || May 3 || Padres || 7–3 || Billingsley (5–0) || Gaudin (0–1) || || 52,096 || 18–8
|- align="center" bgcolor="bbffbb"
| 27 || May 4 || Diamondbacks || 7–2 || Stults (3–1) || Davis (2–4) || || 30,530 || 19–8
|- align="center" bgcolor="bbffbb"
| 28 || May 5 || Diamondbacks || 3–1 || Weaver (1–0) || Scherzer (0–3) || Broxton (8) || 33,557 || 20–8
|- align="center" bgcolor="bbffbb"
| 29 || May 6 || Nationals || 10–3 || Kershaw (1–2) || Cabrera (0–3) || || 31,348 || 21–8
|- align="center" bgcolor="ffbbbb"
| 30 || May 7 || Nationals || 11–9 || Villone (1–0) || Wade (0–2) || || 37,074 || 21–9
|- align="center" bgcolor="ffbbbb"
| 31 || May 8 || Giants || 3–1 || Zito (1–2) || Billingsley (5–1) || Wilson (7) || 51,209 || 21–10
|- align="center" bgcolor="bbffbb"
| 32 || May 9 || Giants || 8–0 || Stults (4–1) || Sánchez (1–3) || || 41,425 || 22–10
|- align="center" bgcolor="ffbbbb"
| 33 || May 10 || Giants || 7–5 (13) || Wilson (2–0) || Mota (2–1) || || 37,529 || 22–11
|- align="center" bgcolor="ffbbbb"
| 34 || May 12 || @ Phillies || 5–3 || Park (1–1) || Kershaw (1–3) || Lidge (5) || 45,191 || 22–12
|- align="center" bgcolor="bbffbb"
| 35 || May 13 || @ Phillies || 9–2 || Wolf (2–1) || Moyer (3–3) || || 45,273 || 23–12
|- align="center" bgcolor="bbffbb"
| 36 || May 14 || @ Phillies || 5–3 (10) || Broxton (4–0) || Durbin (1–1) || Troncoso (2) || 45,307 || 24–12
|- align="center" bgcolor="bbffbb"
| 37 || May 15 || @ Marlins || 6–4 || Weaver (2–0) || Volstad (2–3) || Broxton (9) || 20,039 || 25–12
|- align="center" bgcolor="ffbbbb"
| 38 || May 16 || @ Marlins || 6–3 || Miller (1–1) || Weaver (2–1) || Lindstrom (7) || 25,132 || 25–13
|- align="center" bgcolor="bbffbb"
| 39 || May 17 || @ Marlins || 12–5 || Kershaw (2–3) || Koronka (0–2) || || 16,332 || 26–13
|- align="center" bgcolor="bbffbb"
| 40 || May 18 || Mets || 3–2 (11) || Troncoso (1–0) || Stokes (1–2) || || 37,136 || 27–13
|- align="center" bgcolor="bbffbb"
| 41 || May 19 || Mets || 5–3 || Billingsley (6–1) || Maine (3–3) || Broxton (10) || 37,857 || 28–13
|- align="center" bgcolor="bbffbb"
| 42 || May 20 || Mets || 2–1 || Leach (1–0) || Putz (1–3) || Broxton (11) || 50,761 || 29–13
|- align="center" bgcolor="ffbbbb"
| 43 || May 22 || Angels || 3–1 || Oliver (1–0) || Wade (0–3) || Fuentes (12) || 55,053 || 29–14
|- align="center" bgcolor="bbffbb"
| 44 || May 23 || Angels || 5–4 (10) || Broxton (5–0) || Arredondo (1–1) || || 55,301 || 30–14
|- align="center" bgcolor="ffbbbb"
| 45 || May 24 || Angels || 10–7 || Bulger (2–1) || Billingsley (6–2) || || 54,122 || 30–15
|- align="center" bgcolor="bbffbb"
| 46 || May 25 || @ Rockies || 16–6 || Ohman (1–0) || de la Rosa (0–5) || || 37,024 || 31–15
|- align="center" bgcolor="bbffbb"
| 47 || May 26 || @ Rockies || 7–1 || Milton (1–0) || Cook (3–2) || || 25,384 || 32–15
|- align="center" bgcolor="bbffbb"
| 48 || May 27 || @ Rockies || 8–6 || Kershaw (3–3) || Jiménez (3–6) || || 22,271 || 33–15
|- align="center" bgcolor="bbffbb"
| 49 || May 28 || @ Cubs || 2–1 || Wolf (3–1) || Wells (0–2) || Troncoso (3) || 39,579 || 34–15
|- align="center" bgcolor="ffbbbb"
| 50 || May 29 || @ Cubs || 2–1 || Lilly (6–4) || Billingsley (6–3) || Gregg (8) || 40,148 || 34–16
|- align="center" bgcolor="ffbbbb"
| 51 || May 30 || @ Cubs || 7–0 || Dempster (4–3) || Stults (4–2) || || 41,153 || 34–17
|- align="center" bgcolor="bbffbb"
| 52 || May 31 || @ Cubs || 8–2 || Milton (2–0) || Marshall (3–4) || || 40,091 || 35–17
|-

|-  bgcolor="ffbbbb"
|- align="center" bgcolor="ffbbbb"
| 53 || June 1 || Diamondbacks || 3–2 || Buckner (2–1) || Kuroda (1–1) || Peña (1) || 32,304 || 35–18
|- align="center" bgcolor="bbffbb"
| 54 || June 2 || Diamondbacks || 6–5 || Weaver (3–1) || Schlereth (0–1) || Broxton (12) || 32,853 || 36–18
|- align="center" bgcolor="bbffbb"
| 55 || June 3 || Diamondbacks || 1–0 || Billingsley (7–3) || Garland (4–5) || Broxton (13) || 33,804 || 37–18
|- align="center" bgcolor="ffbbbb"
| 56 || June 4 || Phillies || 3–0 || Hamels (4–2) || Kershaw (3–4) || || 33,839 || 37–19
|- align="center" bgcolor="bbffbb"
| 57 || June 5 || Phillies || 4–3 || Broxton (6–0) || Lidge (0–3) || || 52,538 || 38–19
|- align="center" bgcolor="bbffbb"
| 58 || June 6 || Phillies || 3–2 (12) || Wade (1–3) || Durbin (1–2) || || 41,412 || 39–19
|- align="center" bgcolor="ffbbbb"
| 59 || June 7 || Phillies || 7–2 || Bastardo (2–0) || Wolf (3–2) || || 42,288 || 39–20
|- align="center" bgcolor="bbffbb"
| 60 || June 9 || Padres || 6–4 || Billingsley (8–3) || Young (4–5) || Broxton (14) || 35,313 || 40–20
|- align="center" bgcolor="ffbbbb"
| 61 || June 10 || Padres || 3–1 || Correia (3–4) || Kershaw (3–5) || Bell (18) || 44,079 || 40–21
|- align="center" bgcolor="ffbbbb"
| 62 || June 12 || @ Rangers || 6–0 || Padilla (5–3) || Kuroda (1–2) || || 36,591 || 40–22
|- align="center" bgcolor="bbffbb"
| 63 || June 13 || @ Rangers || 3–1 || Wade (2–3) || Grilli (0–1) || Broxton (15) || 37,262 || 41–22
|- align="center" bgcolor="bbffbb"
| 64 || June 14 || @ Rangers || 6–3 || Billingsley (9–3) || Holland (1–4) || Broxton (16) || 36,343 || 42–22
|- align="center" bgcolor="bbffbb"
| 65 || June 16 || Athletics || 5–4 (10) || Mota (3–1) || Ziegler (1–2) || || 41,169 || 43–22
|- align="center" bgcolor="ffbbbb"
| 66 || June 17 || Athletics || 5–4 || Cahill (4–5) || Kuroda (1–3) || Bailey (6) || 46,274 || 43–23
|- align="center" bgcolor="bbffbb"
| 67 || June 18 || Athletics || 3–2 || Leach (2–0) || Ziegler (1–3) || Troncoso (4) || 50,492 || 44–23
|- align="center" bgcolor="ffbbbb"
| 68 || June 19 || @ Angels || 5–4 || Speier (3–1) || Mota (3–2) || Fuentes (19) || 44,222 || 44–24
|- align="center" bgcolor="bbffbb"
| 69 || June 20 || @ Angels || 6–4 || Weaver (4–1)  || Weaver (7–3) || || 44,148 || 45–24
|- align="center" bgcolor="bbffbb"
| 70 || June 21 || @ Angels || 5–3 || Kershaw (4–5) || Lackey (2–3) || Broxton (17) || 43,891 || 46–24
|- align="center" bgcolor="bbffbb"
| 71 || June 23 || @ White Sox || 5–2 || Kuroda (2–3) || Danks (5–6) || Broxton (18) || 22,251 || 47–24
|- align="center" bgcolor="ffbbbb"
| 72 || June 24 || @ White Sox || 10–7 || Floyd (5–5) || Wolf (3–3) || Jenks (18) || 20,142 || 47–25
|- align="center" bgcolor="ffbbbb"
| 73 || June 25 || @ White Sox || 6–5 (13) || Poreda (1–0) || Weaver (4–2) || || 20,051 || 47–26
|- align="center" bgcolor="bbffbb"
| 74 || June 26 || Mariners || 8–2 || Kershaw (5–5) || Vargas (3–3) || || 50,752 || 48–26
|- align="center" bgcolor="ffbbbb"
| 75 || June 27 || Mariners || 5–1 || Hernández (8–3) || Milton (2–1) || || 50,847 || 48–27
|- align="center" bgcolor="ffbbbb"
| 76 || June 28 || Mariners || 4–2 || Olson (3–2) || Kuroda (2–4) || Aardsma (16) || 49,355 || 48–28
|- align="center" bgcolor="bbffbb"
| 77 || June 29 || Rockies || 4–2 (13) || McDonald (2–1) || Peralta (0–1) || || 41,288 || 49–28
|- align="center" bgcolor="ffbbbb"
| 78 || June 30 || Rockies || 3–0 || Marquis (10–5) || Billingsley (9–4) || || 43,437 || 49–29
|-

|-  bgcolor="ffbbbb"
|- align="center" bgcolor="bbffbb"
| 79 || July 1 || Rockies || 1–0 || Troncoso (2–0) || Hammel (5–4) || Broxton (19) || 40,455 || 50–29
|- align="center" bgcolor="bbffbb"
| 80 || July 3 || @ Padres || 6–3 || Kuroda (3–4) || Gaudin (4–7) || Broxton (20) || 42,217 || 51–29
|- align="center" bgcolor="ffbbbb"
| 81 || July 4 || @ Padres || 7–4 || Burke (1–0) || Belisario (1–3) || Bell (23) || 42,069 || 51–30
|- align="center" bgcolor="bbffbb"
| 82 || July 5 || @ Padres || 7–6 (13) || Weaver (5–2) || Mujica (2–4) || || 30,070 || 52–30
|- align="center" bgcolor="bbffbb"
| 83 || July 7 || @ Mets || 8–0 || Kershaw (6–5) || Pelfrey (6–4) || || 39,636 || 53–30
|- align="center" bgcolor="ffbbbb"
| 84 || July 8 || @ Mets || 5–4 || Pérez (2–2) || Kuroda (3–5) || Rodríguez (22) || 40,027 || 53–31
|- align="center" bgcolor="bbffbb"
| 85 || July 9 || @ Mets || 11–2 || Wolf (4–3) || Hernández (5–5) || || 39,865 || 54–31
|- align="center" bgcolor="bbffbb"
| 86 || July 10 || @ Brewers || 12–8 (10) || Troncoso (3–0) || Villanueva (2–6) || || 41,811 || 55–31
|- align="center" bgcolor="ffbbbb"
| 87 || July 11 || @ Brewers || 6–3 || Burns (2–2) || Weaver (5–3) || Hoffman (20) || 43,466 || 55–32
|- align="center" bgcolor="bbffbb"
| 88 || July 12 || @ Brewers || 7–4 || Kershaw (7–5) || Gallardo (8–7) || Troncoso (5) || 42,241 || 56–32
|- align="center" bgcolor="ffbbbb"
| 89 || July 16 || Astros || 3–0 || Rodríguez (9–6) || Wolf (4–4) || Valverde (9) || 45,970 || 56–33
|- align="center" bgcolor="ffbbbb"
| 90 || July 17 || Astros || 8–1 || Oswalt (6–4) || Billingsley (9–5) || || 51,209 || 56–34
|- align="center" bgcolor="bbffbb"
| 91 || July 18 || Astros || 5–2 || Kershaw (8–5) || Hampton (5–7) || Broxton (21) || 48,298 || 57–34
|- align="center" bgcolor="bbffbb"
| 92 || July 19 || Astros || 4–3 || Troncoso (4–0) || Hawkins (1–4) || Broxton (22) || 40,340 || 58–34
|- align="center" bgcolor="bbffbb"
| 93 || July 20 || Reds || 7–5 || Schmidt (1–0) || Owings (6–10) || Broxton (23) || 48,110 || 59–34
|- align="center" bgcolor="bbffbb"
| 94 || July 21 || Reds || 12–3 || Wolf (5–4) || Bailey (1–2) || || 49,027 || 60–34
|- align="center" bgcolor="bbffbb"
| 95 || July 22 || Reds || 6–2 || Billingsley (10–5) || Arroyo (10–9) || || 56,000 || 61–34
|- align="center" bgcolor="ffbbbb"
| 96 || July 24 || Marlins || 6–3 || Johnson (9–2) || McDonald (2–2) || Núñez (7) || 51,565 || 61–35
|- align="center" bgcolor="bbffbb"
| 97 || July 25 || Marlins || 4–3 || Broxton (7–0) || Meyer (2–1) || || 50,248 || 62–35
|- align="center" bgcolor="ffbbbb"
| 98 || July 26 || Marlins || 8–6 || Volstad (8–9) || Schmidt (1–1) || || 48,597 || 62–36
|- align="center" bgcolor="ffbbbb"
| 99 || July 27 || @ Cardinals || 6–1 || Carpenter (9–3) || Wolf (5–5) || Franklin (23) || 43,756 || 62–37
|- align="center" bgcolor="ffbbbb"
| 100 || July 28 || @ Cardinals || 10–0 || Wainwright (12–6) || Billingsley (10–6) || || 40,105 || 62–38
|- align="center" bgcolor="ffbbbb"
| 101 || July 29 || @ Cardinals || 3–2 (15) || Hawksworth (1–0) || Weaver (5–4) || || 40,011 || 62–39
|- align="center" bgcolor="bbffbb"
| 102 || July 30 || @ Cardinals || 5–3 (10) || McDonald (3–2) || Reyes (0–2) || Broxton (24) || 43,263 || 63–39
|- align="center" bgcolor="bbffbb"
| 103 || July 31 || @ Braves || 5–0 || Schmidt (2–1) || Hanson (5–2) || || 45,225 || 64–39
|-

|-  bgcolor="ffbbbb"
|- align="center" bgcolor="ffbbbb"
| 104 || August 1 || @ Braves || 4–3 || Lowe (11–7) || Wolf (5–6) || Soriano (16) || 49,843 || 64–40
|- align="center" bgcolor="bbffbb"
| 105 || August 2 || @ Braves || 9–1 || Billingsley (11–6) || Jurrjens (9–8) || || 37,654 || 65–40
|- align="center" bgcolor="ffbbbb"
| 106 || August 3 || Brewers || 6–5 || Parra (6–8) || Kershaw (8–6) || Hoffman (24) || 46,544 || 65–41
|- align="center" bgcolor="bbffbb"
| 107 || August 4 || Brewers || 17–4 || Kuroda (4–5) || Gallardo (10–8) || || 45,535 || 66–41
|- align="center" bgcolor="ffbbbb"
| 108 || August 5 || Brewers || 4–1 || Looper (10–5) || Schmidt (2–2) || Hoffman (25) || 50,276 || 66–42
|- align="center" bgcolor="bbffbb"
| 109 || August 6 || Braves || 5–4 || Elbert (2–0) || Soriano (1–3) || || 46,399 || 67–42
|- align="center" bgcolor="ffbbbb"
| 110 || August 7 || Braves || 9–5 (12) || Moylan (4–2) || Troncoso (4–1) || || 53,184 || 67–43
|- align="center" bgcolor="ffbbbb"
| 111 || August 8 || Braves || 2–1 (10) || Medlen (3–3) || Mota (3–3) || Soriano (17) || 53,338 || 67–44
|- align="center" bgcolor="ffbbbb"
| 112 || August 9 || Braves || 8–2 || Vázquez (10–7) || Stults (4–3) || || 45,438 || 67–45
|- align="center" bgcolor="bbffbb"
| 113 || August 10 || @ Giants || 4–2 || Kuroda (5–5) || Sánchez (5–10) || Broxton (25) || 40,522 || 68–45
|- align="center" bgcolor="bbffbb"
| 114 || August 11 || @ Giants || 9–1 || Wolf (6–6) || Martinez (2–1) || || 41,167 || 69–45
|- align="center" bgcolor="ffbbbb"
| 115 || August 12 || @ Giants || 4–2 (10) || Wilson (4–5) || Mota (3–4) || || 43,300 || 69–46
|- align="center" bgcolor="ffbbbb"
| 116 || August 14 || @ Diamondbacks || 4–1 || Haren (12–7) || Kershaw (8–7) || Qualls (22) || 31,573 || 69–47
|- align="center" bgcolor="ffbbbb"
| 117 || August 15 || @ Diamondbacks || 4–3 (10) || Qualls (2–1) || Troncoso (4–2) || || 42,058 || 69–48
|- align="center" bgcolor="bbffbb"
| 118 || August 16 || @ Diamondbacks || 9–3 || Wolf (7–6) || Petit (2–7) || || 34,012 || 70–48
|- align="center" bgcolor="ffbbbb"
| 119 || August 17 || Cardinals || 3–2 || Carpenter (13–3) || Haeger (0–1) || Franklin (30) || 49,415 || 70–49
|- align="center" bgcolor="bbffbb"
| 120 || August 18 || Cardinals || 7–3 || Billingsley (12–6) || Boggs (1–2) || Broxton (26) || 49,052 || 71–49
|- align="center" bgcolor="ffbbbb"
| 121 || August 19 || Cardinals || 3–2 || McClellan (4–2) || Broxton (7–1) || Franklin (31) || 54,847 || 71–50
|- align="center" bgcolor="bbffbb"
| 122 || August 20 || Cubs || 7–2 || Belisario (2–3) || Guzmán (2–3) || || 48,974 || 72–50
|- align="center" bgcolor="bbffbb"
| 123 || August 21 || Cubs || 2–1 || Wolf (8–6) || Wells (9–6) || Broxton (27) || 51,579 || 73–50
|- align="center" bgcolor="bbffbb"
| 124 || August 22 || Cubs || 2–0 || Haeger (1–1) || Lilly (9–8) || Sherrill (1) || 49,297 || 74–50
|- align="center" bgcolor="ffbbbb"
| 125 || August 23 || Cubs || 3–1 || Dempster (7–7) || Billingsley (12–7) || Mármol (5) || 49,711 || 74–51
|- align="center" bgcolor="ffbbbb"
| 126 || August 25 || @ Rockies || 5–4 (10) || Herges (1–0) || McDonald (3–3) || || 31,472 || 74–52
|- align="center" bgcolor="bbffbb"
| 127 || August 26 || @ Rockies || 6–1 || Wolf (9–6) || Fogg (0–2) || || 38,350 || 75–52
|- align="center" bgcolor="bbffbb"
| 128 || August 27 || @ Rockies || 3–2 || Padilla (1–0) || de la Rosa (12–9) || Broxton (28) || 33,441 || 76–52
|- align="center" bgcolor="ffbbbb"
| 129 || August 28 || @ Reds || 4–2 || Bailey (4–4) || Billingsley (12–8) ||  || 19,258 || 76–53
|- align="center" bgcolor="bbffbb"
| 130 || August 29 || @ Reds || 11–4 || Weaver (6–4) || Maloney (0–3) || || 25,744 || 77–53
|- align="center" bgcolor="bbffbb"
| 131 || August 30 || @ Reds || 3–2 (12) || McDonald (4–3) || Cordero (2–4) || Broxton (29) || 26,091 || 78–53
|- align="center" bgcolor="ffbbbb"
| 132 || August 31 || Diamondbacks || 5–3 (10) || Vásquez (3–2) || McDonald (4–4) || Gutiérrez (2) || 45,211 || 78–54
|-

|-  bgcolor="ffbbbb"
|- align="center" bgcolor="bbffbb"
| 133 || September 1 || Diamondbacks || 4–3 || Belisario (3–3) || Rosales (1–1) || Broxton (30) || 45,433 || 79–54
|- align="center" bgcolor="ffbbbb"
| 134 || September 2 || Diamondbacks || 4–1 || Scherzer (9–8) || Billingsley (12–9) || Gutiérrez (3) || 45,076 || 79–55
|- align="center" bgcolor="bbffbb"
| 135 || September 3 || Diamondbacks || 4–2 || Garland (9–11) || Buckner (2–6) || Broxton (31) || 45,365 || 80–55
|- align="center" bgcolor="ffbbbb"
| 136 || September 4 || Padres || 2–0 || LeBlanc (1–1) || Kershaw (8–8) || Bell (34) || 52,965 || 80–56
|- align="center" bgcolor="bbffbb"
| 137 || September 5 || Padres || 7–4 || Wolf (10–6) || Latos (4–5) || Broxton (32) || 53,368 || 81–56
|- align="center" bgcolor="ffbbbb"
| 138 || September 6 || Padres || 4–3 || Stauffer (4–6) || Kuroda (5–6) || Bell (35) || 47,528 || 81–57
|- align="center" bgcolor="bbffbb"
| 139 || September 7 || @ Diamondbacks || 7–2 || Padilla (2–0) || Scherzer (9–9) || Broxton (33) || 28,317 || 82–57
|- align="center" bgcolor="bbffbb"
| 140 || September 8 || @ Diamondbacks || 5–4 || McDonald (5–4) || Schlereth (0–3) || Broxton (34) || 22,589 || 83–57
|- align="center" bgcolor="ffbbbb"
| 141 || September 9 || @ Diamondbacks || 4–3 || Gutiérrez (4–3) || Troncoso (4–3) || || 20,025 || 83–58
|- align="center" bgcolor="bbffbb"
| 142 || September 11 || @ Giants || 10–3 || Kuroda (6–6) || Cain (13–5) || || 39,212 || 84–58
|- align="center" bgcolor="bbffbb"
| 143 || September 12 || @ Giants || 9–1 || Padilla (3–0) || Sánchez (6–12) || || 41,710 || 85–58
|- align="center" bgcolor="ffbbbb"
| 144 || September 13 || @ Giants || 7–2 || Penny (3–0) || Billingsley (12–10) || || 40,579 || 85–59
|- align="center" bgcolor="bbffbb"
| 145 || September 14 || Pirates || 6–2 || Garland (10–11) || McCutchen (0–2) || || 42,045 || 86–59
|- align="center" bgcolor="bbffbb"
| 146 || September 15 || Pirates || 5–4 (13) || Belisario (4–3) || Dumatrait (0–1) || || 52,562 || 87–59
|- align="center" bgcolor="bbffbb"
| 147 || September 16 || Pirates || 3–1 || Kuroda (7–6) || Hart (4–7) || Broxton (35) || 53,193 || 88–59
|- align="center" bgcolor="ffbbbb"
| 148 || September 18 || Giants || 8–4 || Howry (2–6) || Troncoso (4–4) || || 53,679 || 88–60
|- align="center" bgcolor="bbffbb"
| 149 || September 19 || Giants || 12–1 || Garland (11–11) || Penny (3–1) || || 52,438 || 89–60
|- align="center" bgcolor="bbffbb"
| 150 || September 20 || Giants || 6–2 || Wolf (11–6) || Lincecum (14–6) || || 53,233 || 90–60
|- align="center" bgcolor="bbffbb"
| 151 || September 22 || @ Nationals || 14–2 || Kuroda (8–6) || Hernández (8–12) || || 18,518 || 91–60
|- align="center" bgcolor="ffbbbb"
| 152 || September 23 || @ Nationals || 5–4 || Rivera (1–3) || McDonald (5–5) || || 18,635 || 91–61
|- align="center" bgcolor="bbffbb"
| 153 || September 24 || @ Nationals || 7–6 || Troncoso (5–4) || Villone (4–6) || Broxton (36) || 22,432 || 92–61
|- align="center" bgcolor="ffbbbb"
| 154 || September 25 || @ Pirates || 3–1 || Veal (1–0) || Garland (11–12) || Capps (26) || 19,452 || 92–62
|- align="center" bgcolor="bbffbb"
| 155 || September 26 || @ Pirates || 8–4 || Sherrill (1–0) || Bautista (1–1) || || 35,605 || 93–62
|- align="center" bgcolor="ffbbbb"
| 156 || September 27 || @ Pirates || 6–5 || Capps (4–8) || Broxton (7–2) || || 26,831 || 93–63
|- align="center" bgcolor="ffbbbb"
| 157 || September 28 || @ Pirates || 11–1 || Duke (11–15) || Kuroda (8–7) || || 16,696 || 93–64
|- align="center" bgcolor="ffbbbb"
| 158 || September 29 || @ Padres || 3–1 || Webb (2–0) || Billingsley (12–11) || Bell (41) || 25,318 || 93–65
|- align="center" bgcolor="ffbbbb"
| 159 || September 30 || @ Padres || 5–0 || Richard (5–2) || Garland (11–13) || || 25,469 || 93–66
|- align="center" bgcolor="ffbbbb"
| 160 || October 2 || Rockies || 4–3 || Jiménez (15–12) || Wolf (11–7) || Street (35) || 54,131 || 93–67
|- align="center" bgcolor="bbffbb"
| 161 || October 3 || Rockies || 5–0 || Kuo (2–0) || Morales (3–2) || || 54,531 || 94–67
|- align="center" bgcolor="bbffbb"
| 162 || October 4 || Rockies || 5–3 || Padilla (4–0) || Marquis (15–13) || Troncoso (6) || 51,396 || 95–67
|-

Notable events

 On April 13, Opening Day at Dodger Stadium, Orlando Hudson hit for the cycle with an infield single in the first inning, a home run in the third, a double in the fourth, and a triple in the sixth. He was the first Dodger to hit for the cycle since Wes Parker in 1970. Hudson became the first Dodger to hit for the cycle at Dodger Stadium, and did it in front of a record crowd of 57,099.
 The Dodgers began the season by going 13–0 at home, beating the previous club record (9–0) held by the 1946 team, the previous National League record (10–0) held by the 1918 Giants, the 1970 Cubs, and the 1983 Braves, and the previous Major League record (12–0) held by the 1911 Tigers.
On May 7, MLB announced a 50-game suspension for Manny Ramirez as a result of his testing positive for a banned substance under the collective bargaining agreement.
On May 25,  in a game at Coors Field against the Colorado Rockies, the Dodgers scored seven runs in the fourth inning and eight runs in the seventh to key a 16–6 rout of the Rockies.
On June 1, in a loss to the Arizona Diamondbacks, the Dodgers had five wild pitches: three by Cory Wade in the seventh inning and two by Brent Leach in the eighth. This set a record for most wild pitches in a single game in Los Angeles Dodgers history and tied a franchise record set in 1918.
On June 5 and 6, Andre Ethier provided a walk-off game-winning hit on each day to defeat the Philadelphia Phillies. Ethier hit a 2-run double in the bottom of the 9th inning on June 5 to give the Dodgers a 4–3 win, and then hit a solo home run in the 12th inning on June 6 to give the Dodgers a 3–2 victory.
On June 20, Jeff Weaver started for the Dodgers against the Los Angeles Angels. The opposing starter was his younger brother Jered Weaver. This was the first pitching matchup between brothers since 2002 when Andy and Alan Benes matched up and only the 15th such game since 1967. The Dodgers won 6–4, with Jeff getting the win and Jered taking the loss.
On July 10, Manny Ramirez hit a two-run homer in the top of the sixth against the Milwaukee Brewers. This home run tied Mickey Mantle for 15th place on the all-time home run list with 536 career home runs. He hit his 537th on July 20 against the Cincinnati Reds to pass Mantle.
On July 22, Manny Ramirez hit a pinch-hit grand slam in the bottom of the sixth inning against the Cincinnati Reds. This was his 21st career grand slam (2nd all-time behind Lou Gehrig) and first career pinch hit homer. The home run came on "Manny Ramirez Bobblehead night" at the Stadium.
The Dodgers did not lose three games in a row until a loss to the St. Louis Cardinals on July 28. They were the last team in the 2009 season to lose three games in a row. This was the deepest into the season a Major League Baseball team had gone without losing three straight since the 2001 Seattle Mariners, who lost their third straight on September 22.
On July 28, in a blowout 10–0 loss to the St. Louis Cardinals, utility infielder Mark Loretta pitched one-third of an inning in the bottom of the eighth for the Dodgers, hitting the first batter and inducing the second batter to fly out. Loretta had pitched an inning of relief in 2001 for the Milwaukee Brewers, and was the first Dodger position player to pitch since Robin Ventura in 2004.
On August 4, the Dodgers beat the Milwaukee Brewers 17–4 at Dodger Stadium. The 17 runs scored was the highest run total by the Dodgers in a home game since they also scored 17 on May 25, 1979, against the Cincinnati Reds. With two outs in the ninth inning, relief pitcher Guillermo Mota hit Brewers first baseman Prince Fielder with a pitch (apparently in retaliation for Chris Smith hitting Manny Ramirez a few innings earlier). Mota was ejected from the game. After the game, Fielder attempted to gain entry into the Dodgers clubhouse to confront Mota but was stopped by security guards. Both Mota and Fielder were fined by Major League Baseball for their actions.
On August 15, in a road game against the Arizona Diamondbacks, Dodgers pitcher Hiroki Kuroda was hit in the head by a line drive off the bat of Rusty Ryal.  After leaving the game, he was diagnosed with a concussion and stayed in the hospital overnight.
On August 20, Russell Martin hit a grand-slam home run in the sixth inning to break open a 2–2 tie and lead the Dodgers to a 7–2 victory over the Chicago Cubs. It was the fourth home run for Martin in the 2009 season and his second career grand slam.
On August 21, Randy Wolf, George Sherrill, and Jonathan Broxton combined to one-hit the Chicago Cubs and beat them 2–1. Wolf hit a double in the second inning to score the Dodgers' only two runs.
On September 5, Randy Wolf picked up his 100th career win, in a 7–4 victory over the San Diego Padres at Dodger Stadium.
On September 8, the Dodgers tied a franchise record by hitting into five double plays in a road game against the Arizona Diamondbacks. Russell Martin (second inning), Rafael Furcal (third inning), James Loney (fourth inning), Matt Kemp (sixth inning) and Ronnie Belliard (seventh inning) all hit into double plays in the game. The Dodgers came from behind to win the game 5–4.
On September 26, the Dodgers came from behind to beat the Pittsburgh Pirates 8–4 at Pittsburgh. The victory clinched a playoff spot for the Dodgers, their third in four seasons. The last time the Dodgers made the playoffs three times in four years was 1963–66.
On October 3, the Dodgers broke open a scoreless game against the Colorado Rockies with a five-run seventh inning and held on for the 5–0 victory that clinched their second straight National League West Championship. It was the first time the Dodgers won back-to-back division pennants since 1977–78.

Opening Day starters

Roster

Postseason

Postseason Game log

|-  bgcolor="ffbbbb"
|- align="center" bgcolor="bbffbb"
| 1 || October 7 || Cardinals || 5–3 || Weaver (1–0) || Carpenter (0–1) || Broxton (1) || 56,000 || 1–0
|- align="center" bgcolor="bbffbb"
| 2 || October 8 || Cardinals || 3–2 || Sherrill (1–0) || Franklin (0–1) || || 51,819 || 2–0
|- align="center" bgcolor="bbffbb"
| 3 || October 10 || @ Cardinals || 5–1 || Padilla (1–0) || Piñeiro (0–1) || || 47,296 || 3–0
|-

|-  bgcolor="ffbbbb"
|- align="center" bgcolor="ffbbbb"
| 1 || October 15 || Phillies || 8–6 || Hamels (1–0) || Kershaw (0–1) || Lidge (1) || 56,000 || 0–1
|- align="center" bgcolor="bbffbb"
| 2 || October 16 || Phillies || 2–1 || Kuo (1–0) || Park (0–1) || Broxton (1) || 56,000 || 1–1
|- align="center" bgcolor="ffbbbb"
| 3 || October 18 || @ Phillies || 11–0 || Lee (1–0) || Kuroda (0–1) || || 45,721 || 1–2
|- align="center" bgcolor="ffbbbb"
| 4 || October 19 || @ Phillies || 5–4 || Lidge (1–0) || Broxton (0–1) || || 46,157 || 1–3
|- align="center" bgcolor="ffbbbb"
| 5 || October 21 || @ Phillies || 10–4 || Durbin (1–0) || Padilla (0–1) || || 46,214 || 1–4
|-

National League Division Series

As National League West Champions, the Dodgers faced the St. Louis Cardinals in the  Division Series and held home field advantage. They swept the Cardinals in three games.

Game 1
Wednesday, October 7, 2009 – 6:37 p.m. (PT) at Dodger Stadium in Los Angeles, California

Game 2
Thursday, October 8, 2009 – 3:07 p.m. (PT) at Dodger Stadium in Los Angeles, California

Game 3
Saturday, October 10, 2009 – 3:07 p.m. (PT) at Busch Stadium in St. Louis, Missouri

National League Championship Series

The Dodgers advanced to the NLCS and faced the Philadelphia Phillies in a rematch of the 2008 National League Championship Series. However, they again lost to the Phillies in five games.

Game 1
Thursday, October 15, 2009 – 5:07 p.m. (PT) at Dodger Stadium in Los Angeles, California

Game 2
Friday, October 16, 2009 – 1:07 p.m. (PT) at Dodger Stadium in Los Angeles, California

Game 3
Sunday, October 18, 2009 – 5:07 p.m. (PT) at Citizens Bank Park in Philadelphia, Pennsylvania

Game 4
Monday, October 19, 2009 – 5:07 p.m. (PT) at Citizens Bank Park in Philadelphia, Pennsylvania

Game 5
Wednesday, October 21, 2009 – 5:07 p.m. (PT) at Citizens Bank Park in Philadelphia, Pennsylvania

Player stats
Team leaders in each category are in bold.

Batting 
Note: G = Games played; AB = At bats; R = Runs; H = Hits; 2B = Doubles; 3B = Triples; HR = Home runs; RBI = Runs batted in; TB = Total bases; BB = Walks; SO = Strikeouts;  SB = Stolen bases; OBP = On-base percentage; SLG = Slugging; Avg. = Batting average

Pitching
Note: W = Wins; L = Losses; ERA = Earned run average; G = Games pitched; GS = Games started; SV = Saves; IP = Innings pitched; R = Runs allowed; ER = Earned runs allowed; BB = Walks allowed; K = Strikeouts

Awards and honors
2009 Major League Baseball All-Star Game
Chad Billingsley reserve
Jonathan Broxton reserve
Orlando Hudson reserve
Gold Glove Award
Orlando Hudson
Matt Kemp
Silver Slugger Award
Andre Ethier
Matt Kemp
Player of the Week
Andre Ethier April 13–19
Andre Ethier July 20–26
Sporting News National League All-Star
Matt Kemp

Notable transactions

July 30: Acquired George Sherrill from the Baltimore Orioles for Josh Bell and Steve Johnson.
July 31: Acquired Vinny Rottino from the Milwaukee Brewers for Claudio Vargas.
August 30: Acquired Ronnie Belliard from the Washington Nationals for Luis Garcia and a player to be named later (Víctor Gárate).
August 31: Acquired Jim Thome and cash from the Chicago White Sox for Justin Fuller and cash.
August 31: Acquired Jon Garland and cash from the Arizona Diamondbacks for a player to be named later (Tony Abreu).

2009 minor league teams

Seven members of the Class-A Great Lakes Loons were named to the Midwest League All-Star Game: catcher Tony Delmonico, shortstop Dee Gordon, second baseman Jamie Pedroza, outfielder Kyle Russell, and pitchers Javy Guerra, Jon Michael Redding and Josh Walter.
Three members of the Class-A Inland Empire 66ers of San Bernardino were named to the California League All-Star Team. They include: Center fielder Trayvon Robinson and starting pitchers Alberto Bastardo and Tim Sexton.
Third Baseman Pedro Baez of the Class-A Inland Empire 66ers of San Bernardino was selected to participate as a member of the "World Team" in the All-Star Futures Game.
Four members of the Class-AA Chattanooga Lookouts were selected to play in the Southern League All-Star Game: C Lucas May, 3B Josh Bell, OF Andrew Lambo and Pitcher Matthew Sartor. Bell was named the MVP of the All-Star game after getting two hits, including a home run, and 2 RBIs in the game.
Charlie Haeger of the AAA Albuquerque Isotopes was selected to the Pacific Coast League All-Star team.
Dee Gordon of the Single-A Great Lakes Loons was named "Prospect of the Year" and "Most Valuable Player" of the Midwest League.  Gordon was also named to the Postseason All-Star team alongside teammates Kyle Russell (who was named co-MVP) and Tony Delmonico. Gordon was later named the Dodgers "Minor League Player of the Year" as well.
Scott Van Slyke of the Single-A Inland Empire 66ers of San Bernardino was named to the California League Post-Season All-Star team.
Mitch Jones and Scott Strickland of the AAA Albuquerque Isotopes were named to the Pacific Coast League Post-Season All-Star Team.
Albuquerque Isotopes Manager Tim Wallach was selected as the Pacific Coast League "Manager of the Year."
Ogden Raptors outfielder Brian Cavazos-Galvez was named MVP of the Rookie-Class Pioneer League.
LHP Scott Elbert was named the Dodgers minor league "Pitcher of the Year." He made 20 appearances with the AA Chattanooga Lookouts and AAA Albuquerque Isotopes during the season and finished 4–4 with a 3.84 ERA. He struck out 125 batters and walked only 44 in 96 innings.

Major League Baseball draft

The Dodgers selected 51 players in this draft. Of those, seven of them have played Major League Baseball. They lost their first-round pick as a result of signing free agent Orlando Hudson but gained a supplemental first-round pick and a second-round pick as a compensation for losing pitcher Derek Lowe.

The Dodgers top pick in this draft was left-handed pitcher Aaron Miller from Baylor University. In five seasons in the minors he was 20–19 with a 4.03 ERA in 82 games (65 starts). Midway through the 2013 season, the Dodgers decided to take him off the mound and turn him into a position player. He hit 14 homers and drove in 60 RBI in 2014 in class-A as a designated hitter but retired after the  season without making it to the Majors.
 
They went the opposite direction with outfielder Blake Smith from University of California, Berkeley. Also in the 2013 season they decided to take Smith and make him into a relief pitcher. He was later traded, and eventually made it to the majors with the Chicago White Sox.

References

External links

2009 Los Angeles Dodgers season Official Site
2009 Los Angeles Dodgers season at Baseball Reference

Los Angeles Dodgers seasons
National League West champion seasons
Los Angeles Dodgers season